Ronald W. Reagan High School (also known as Reagan High School) is a public high school in Pfafftown, North Carolina, United States, under the direction of the Winston-Salem/Forsyth County Schools system. It is named after former U.S. president Ronald Reagan. It had a student population of approximately 1,850 during the 2014–2015 school year. The school was constructed to begin operation at the beginning of the 2005–2006 school year. The class of 2007 was the first to graduate from Reagan High School. Brad Royal is the current principal.

Athletics 
Reagan is a North Carolina High School Athletic Association (NCHSAA) 4A school, the state's highest level. The school fields the following athletic teams: baseball, basketball, cheerleading, cross country, field hockey, football, golf, ice hockey, indoor track, lacrosse, soccer, softball, swimming, tennis, track and field, volleyball, wrestling.

In 2014, the men's soccer team won the first sport state championship in Reagan's school history, with a 1–0 win over Broughton in the NCHSAA 4A championship match.

Notable alumni
Craig Engels  middle-distance runner, member of the Nike Oregon Project

References 

Reagan
Educational institutions established in 2005
Public high schools in North Carolina
Schools in Forsyth County, North Carolina
2005 establishments in North Carolina